The Sunny Side of the Street is a 2022 Hong Kong drama film written and directed by Lau Kok-rui. The feature debut of Malaysia-born Lau Kok-rui, the film tells the story of a Hong Kong-born Pakistani refugee boy who forms an unexpected bond with a local taxi driver.

Cast
 Anthony Wong
 Sahal Zaman
 Endy Chow
 Inderjeet Singh
 Kiranjeet Gill

Production
The Sunny Side of the Street is produced mainly by Petra Films, a new production company under Petra Group, a global conglomerate run by Malaysian businessman Vinod Sekhar. Produced on an estimated cost of around US$1 million, the film also marks the studio's debut project.

Awards and nominations

References

External links
 
 

2022 films
2022 drama films
Hong Kong drama films
2020s Cantonese-language films
2020s Urdu-language films